Mutford is a village and civil parish in the East Suffolk District of the English county of Suffolk. The parish borders Barnby, Carlton Colville, Gisleham, Rushmere, Henstead with Hulver Street, Ellough and North Cove. The village gave its name to the Half Hundred of Mutford which is named in the Domesday Book.

The parish had a population of 471 at the 2011 United Kingdom census. The A146 Beccles to Lowestoft road runs to north of the parish, cutting through the north-western corner. The Hundred River marks the southern boundary with Henstead with Hulver Street.

Culture and community
The majority of the parish is rural, with the main centre of population centred on an area in the centre of the parish. The post office closed in 2013, with few services remaining beyond a village hall and playing field. The medieval church of St Andrew is one of around 40 round-tower churches in Suffolk and is a Grade I Listed Building.

Notable people
Sir Stanley Rous, former president of FIFA, was born in Mutford in 1895. Also born in the village was Bill Crooks, manager of Eastwoodhill Arboretum, Ngatapa, Gisborne, New Zealand from 1967 to 1974.

Notes

References

External links 

Mutford Village website
Website with photos of Mutford St Andrew, a round-tower church

Villages in Suffolk
Civil parishes in Suffolk
Waveney District